Gonzalo Antonio Fierro Caniullán (born 21 March 1983) is a Chilean former footballer who played as a defender or midfielder.

Club career

Fierro began his career at Chilean giants Colo-Colo, being promoted to first-adult team in 2002. Along the seasons, he break into the first team and then he became an undisputed player with Claudio Borghi with whom won four league titles and reached a 2006 Copa Sudamericana runner-up, all of active way.

On 26 August 2008, Fierro joined Brazilian powerhouse Flamengo becoming the first Chilean player on join the club. Nevertheless, he only completed eight league games in his debut season. In 2009, Fierro had a more active role in the team after being chosen to replace Ibson who left the club on loan, playing 24 games and scoring one goal against 2008 Série A defending champions São Paulo in a 1–1 away draw. That season he helped Flamengo to win the Brasileirão.

On 15 July 2010, was reported that Fierro joined Boca Juniors in an alleged request of Claudio Borghi to the club board. However a serious injury stopped his incorporation and on 17 August it was confirmed that he left the club for return to Rio de Janeiro with Flamengo and start his recuperation.

In 2012, Fierro returned to Colo-Colo. Following Pablo Contreras departure, he became the club's captain and in 2014 he was part of the Torneo Clausura team champion, where he was an undisputed player.

In July 2021, he announced his retirement from the football activity at the age of 38.

International career
In 2006, he received his first international cap and debuted against Colombia on 16 August. The following year he was included in Chile's squad for the 2007 Copa América. On 30 January 2008, he scored his first international goal during a game against South Korea where scored the only one goal of the game in a 1–0 win over the Asians.

Frequently called up by Marcelo Bielsa for the 2010 World Cup qualification, he was chosen into Chile's list of 23 to face South Africa's World Cup. On 9 June, prior Group H opening game against Honduras, Chile played an unofficial friendly against New Zealand where Fierro scored the second goal of his country's 2–0 victory.

Personal life
Both Fierro, whose second last name is Caniullán, and his wife are of Mapuche descent. Due to this, as the Colo-Colo team captain he used to wear an armband with Mapuche motif.

Career statistics

Club statistics

International goals

Post retirement
In 2022, he joined TNT Sports Chile as a commentator and analyst of the Primera B de Chile.

Honours

Club
Colo-Colo
 Primera División de Chile (8): 2002–C, 2006–A, 2006–C, 2007–A, 2007–C, 2014–C, 2015–A, 2017 Transición
 Copa Sudamericana: Runner-up 2006
 Copa Chile: 2016
 Supercopa de Chile (2): 2017, 2018

Flamengo
 Campeonato Carioca: 2009, 2011
 Campeonato Brasileiro Série A: 2009

Individual
Primera División de Chile Top Scorer: 2005–C

References

External links
Player Profile @ Flamengo.com.br 
ogol.com.br 

1983 births
Living people
Footballers from Santiago
Chilean people of Mapuche descent
Mapuche sportspeople
Chilean footballers
Chile international footballers
Chilean expatriate footballers
Association football forwards
Colo-Colo footballers
CR Flamengo footballers
Colo-Colo B footballers
C.D. Antofagasta footballers
Deportes Colina footballers
Chilean Primera División players
Campeonato Brasileiro Série A players
Segunda División Profesional de Chile players
2007 Copa América players
2011 Copa América players
Expatriate footballers in Brazil
Chilean expatriate sportspeople in Brazil
Chilean expatriates in Brazil
2010 FIFA World Cup players
Indigenous sportspeople of the Americas
Chilean association football commentators
TNT Sports Chile color commentators